"The One for Me" is a song by American R&B singer Joe. It was written by Joe, Denvil Tracey Gerrell, and Keith Miller for his debut studio album Everything (1993), while production was helmed by Joe, featuring co-production from Miller. Released as the album's second single from, it reached number 39 on Billboards Hot R&B/Hip-Hop Songs in the US, while peaking at number 34 on the UK Singles Chart.

Track listings

Credits and personnel
 Denvil Tracey Gerrell – writer
 Keith Miller – producer, writer
 Special Tee – mixing
 Adam Kudzin - Audio engineer
 Joe Thomas – producer, vocals, writer

Charts

References

Joe (singer) songs
1993 singles
1993 songs
New jack swing songs
Song recordings produced by Joe (singer)
Songs written by Joe (singer)